Parnasala is a village in the Indian state of Telangana.

Parnasala may also refer to:
 Parnasala of Santhigiri, a monument in the Santhigiri hermitage, Kerala, India
 Parnasala, Andaman, a village in Andaman Islands, India